Hollywood 7 (known as S Club 7 in Hollywood in the U.S.) is the third series in the BBC television series starring British pop group S Club 7 and the second television series shot in California. The programme is shown every week on CBBC from 27 September 2001 and 20 December 2001 and stars all seven members of the band as fictionalized versions of themselves. The series also features former Brady Bunch actor Barry Williams as Dean Strickland, S Club 7's manager.

Following the pattern of the previous series of the show, the show is renamed S Club 7 in Hollywood for American audiences. It aires on the renamed ABC Family network from 29 September 2001 to 26 January 2002.

Plot
In the first episode of the series, the group decide to give themselves 24 hours to get themselves a new manager. The group come across Dean Strickland and he adopts the seven as their new manager. Shortly into the series, the group find themselves without a record deal and so they have to search for a deal, or else they will disband. Luckily, the group find a record company willing to sign them. Unlike Miami 7 and L.A. 7, which portrays S Club 7 as struggling just to make known of their existence, Hollywood 7 portrays the group experiencing what they have been hoping for since they came to the States: having an agent, getting a record deal, becoming publicized, etc. They film their first music video, become a support act for a Latin heart-throb, and even have their first concert. At the end of the series, the group have to move back to England to record their album and start internationally promoting S Club 7, just as they are starting to become fully assimilated into American life.

The series also saw, shadowing real life, something between Hannah and Paul develop. In the fifth episode of the series, they share a kiss which sends shock waves throughout the band.

Cast

Main
 Tina Barrett as Tina
 Paul Cattermole as Paul
 Jon Lee as Jon
 Bradley McIntosh as Bradley
 Jo O'Meara as Jo
 Hannah Spearritt as Hannah
 Rachel Stevens as Rachel
 Barry Williams as Dean Strickland

Recurring
 James R. Black as Gordon
 Shalim Ortiz as Miguel Delgado

Episodes

Video releases
Hollywood 7 was released on PAL video on 29 April 2002. Unlike previous releases, it is only available in a "Complete Boxset" containing all thirteen episodes. The series was never released in America on NTSC VHS, nor was it ever released on DVD in United States or the United Kingdom.

References

External links 
 

S Club 7 television series
2000s British children's television series
2001 British television series debuts
2001 British television series endings
ABC Family original programming
Television series by Disney–ABC Domestic Television
BBC children's television shows
British children's musical television series
Television shows set in Los Angeles
Television series based on singers and musicians